James, Jimmy, Jimmie, or Jim Bennett may refer to:

Arts and entertainment
 James Gordon Bennett Sr. (1795–1872), American founding publisher of the New York Herald newspaper
 James Gordon Bennett Jr. (1841–1918), American newspaper publisher and sports enthusiast
 James O'Donnell Bennett (1870–1940), American journalist and author
 Jim Bennett (poet) (born 1951), English poet
 Jimmy Bennett (born 1996), American actor and musician
 Jimmy Ray Bennett, American actor

Politics and law
 James Bennett (Australian politician) (1874–1951), Member of the Australian House of Representatives
 James Bennett (British politician) (1912–1984), Scottish Labour Party politician and MP
 James L. Bennett (1849–1918), American lawyer from New York
 James R. Bennett (1940–2016), Alabama secretary of state and state senator
 Jim Bennett (politician) (fl. 2006–2015), Newfoundland and Labrador MHA
 Jim Bennett (Utah politician), candidate in the 2017 Utah's 3rd congressional district special election

Science and medicine
 James C. Bennett (born 1948), American technologist and space launch pioneer
 James Henry Bennett (1816–1891), English physician
 Sir James Risdon Bennett (1809–1891), English physician
 Jim Bennett (historian) (born 1947), British museum curator and historian of science

Sports
 James Bennett (Australian footballer) (born 1964), Australian rules footballer with Hawthorn
 James Bennett (cricketer) (1775–1855), English cricketer
 James Bennett (footballer, born 1988), English footballer
 James Bennett (Scottish footballer) (1891–1955), Scottish footballer
 Jimmie Bennett (1919–1991), American baseball player
 Jim Bennett (hurler) (1944–2014), Irish hurler
 Jim Bennett (rugby league) (died 1969), Australian rugby league footballer

Others
 James Bennett (minister) (1774–1862), English congregationalist minister and college principal
 James Bennett (Tewkesbury) (1785–1856), British printer, bookseller, publisher and antiquarian
 James H. Bennett (1877–?), American sailor and Medal of Honor recipient
 James M. Bennett (born 1948), American nonpartisan tax activist
 James V. Bennett (1894–1978), American penal reformer

Other uses
 James Gordon Bennett (pilot boat), American pilot boat built in 1870

See also
 Jamie Bennett (disambiguation)
 James Bennet (disambiguation)
 Bennett (name)